The FIL World Luge Championships 1963 took place in Imst, Austria.

Men's singles

Women's singles

Geisler becomes the first woman to repeat as World Champion.

Doubles

Medal table

References
Men's doubles World Champions
Men's singles World Champions
Women's singles World Champions

FIL World Luge Championships
Sport in Tyrol (state)
1963 in luge
1963 in Austrian sport
Luge in Austria